Teleorman may refer to:

 Teleorman County, a county of Romania
 Teleorman (river), a river in southern Romania
 The Teleorman, a Romanian navy longboat lost in the Sinking of the Teleorman

See also
 Diocese of Alexandria and Teleorman
 Teleormanu, a village in Mârzănești, Romania